The Livonia Avenue station (or Livonia Avenue-Junius Street station) is an elevated station on the BMT Canarsie Line of the New York City Subway. Located at the intersection of Livonia and Van Sinderen Avenues at the border of Brownsville and East New York, Brooklyn, it is served by the L train at all times.

History
This station opened on July 28, 1906.

The station was renovated in 2005-2006 at a cost of $13.83 million. The 2007 artwork here is called Seasons by Philemona Williamson. It consists of stained glass windows on the platform windscreens depicted events related to the four seasons of meteorology.

Transfer with New Lots Line
The Canarsie Line passes under the IRT New Lots Line with the Junius Street station (served by the ) directly to the west of this station and there is a free transfer between the two stations, which can only be accessed by walking outside the stations and using a MetroCard or OMNY. Passengers originally transferred between the two stations for an additional fare by using an overpass running parallel to the New Lots Line which allows pedestrians on Livonia Avenue to cross over the Long Island Rail Road's open-cut Bay Ridge Branch.

In 2015, there were proposals to convert the overpass to a free-transfer passage between the two stations due to increasing ridership and plans for additional housing in the area. Both stations would also have been upgraded to become compliant with mobility accessibility guidelines under the Americans with Disabilities Act of 1990. Money was allocated in the 2015–2019 Capital Program to build this transfer. However, in an April 2018 revision to the Capital Program, funding for the project - with the exception of funding already used to design the connection - was removed. Regardless, a free MetroCard and OMNY transfer between the two stations was provided during weekends and late nights as part of the reconstruction of the 14th Street Tunnel starting in April 2019; it was made permanent in February 2020.

The 2020–2024 Capital Program added back funding for the accessibility project, with an allocation of $38.4 million; by January 2020, only $400,000 of that amount had been spent on "pre-design" activities. In February 2020, the MTA awarded a design–build contract to construct the free transfer and associated elevator upgrades. By fall 2020, ADA improvements at the Livonia Avenue station were underway. The Rockaway Parkway-bound platform was temporarily closed for modifications on November 15, 2020 and reopened on March 9, 2021. The Manhattan-bound platform was temporarily closed for similar modifications on March 29, 2021 and reopened on July 14, 2021. The project to make the station accessible was completed on May 17, 2022, and the new elevators were officially opened in June 2022.

Station layout

This elevated station has two side platforms and two tracks. Both platforms have beige windscreens and red canopies in their centers and barb wired fences at either ends. They are all supported by green frames.

Just south of this station is a spur branching off towards the Linden Shops & Yard. Another spur branches off of the IRT New Lots Line, which crosses over Livonia Avenue, and connects with track from the Canarsie Line before entering the yard. These spurs and the yard have no third rail and are used by New York City Transit diesel locomotives going to and from the facility.

Exits
The station's main entrance/exit is a ground-level station house directly underneath the platforms on the north side of the T-intersection of Van Sinderen and Livonia Avenues. It has a turnstile bank, token booth, and one staircase to each platform at the center. The Canarsie-bound platform has a secondary exit leading directly to the pedestrian bridge that contains two HEET turnstiles, an emergency gate, and a small staircase.

Right next to the station house is a pedestrian bridge that spans west above the adjacent and parallel Bay Ridge Branch of the Long Island Rail Road and leads to Junius Street, where the entrance to a station of the same name on the IRT New Lots Line is less than a block away.

References

External links 

 
 Station Reporter — L Train
 The Subway Nut — Livonia Avenue Pictures
 MTA's Arts For Transit — Livonia Avenue (BMT Canarsie Line)
 Livonia Avenue entrance from Google Maps Street View
 Platforms from Google Maps Street View

BMT Canarsie Line stations
New York City Subway stations in Brooklyn
Railway stations in the United States opened in 1906
1906 establishments in New York City
Brownsville, Brooklyn
East New York, Brooklyn